The AgZ  Championship is a women's professional wrestling championship, situated at the top championship hierarchy of the japanese professional wrestling promotion Actwres girl'Z. In November 2021, Actwres girl'Z announced the dissolution of their Color's and Beginning brands, in favor of a more entertainment-based product. On February 13, 2022, the company ran their first ACTwrestling show under their new format. Therefore, between December 2021 and March 2023, the title was deactivated. Overall there have been 5 reigns shared between 5 different champions, and one vacancy. 

Like most professional wrestling championships, the title is won as a result of a scripted match. The current champion is Miku Aono who is in her first reign.

Reigns

Combined reigns 

{| class="wikitable sortable" style="text-align: center"
!Rank
!Wrestler
!No. ofreigns
!Combineddefenses
!Combineddays
|-
!1
| Miyuki Takase || 1 || 5 || 515
|-
!2
| Saori Anou || 1 || 4 || 272
|-
!3
| Saki || 1 || 3 || 270
|-
!4
| Reika Saiki || 1 || 0 || 36
|-
!5
| style="background-color:#FFE6BD"| Miku Aono † || 1 || 0 || +

References

External links 
Actwres girl'Z official site, in Japanese

Women's professional wrestling championships